Raven's Ait is an ait (island) in the Thames between Surbiton, Kingston and Hampton Court Park in the Royal Borough of Kingston upon Thames, London, England, in the reach of the river above Teddington Lock. Used as a boating training centre for many years, Raven's Ait is currently privately run as a catering facility and a conference and wedding venue.

Geography
Raven's Ait is a Thames ait between Surbiton, Kingston and Hampton Court Park in the Royal Borough of Kingston upon Thames in the centre of the non-tidal reach above Teddington Lock, and immediately below Seething Wells.

Access to the island is by ferry from Queen's Promenade on the south bank of the Thames. This is adjacent to the Thames Sailing Club and a small area, once a draw dock, used for transporting goods to the area and the former fresh water works to the south.

History
Raven's Ait is a possible site for the signing of documents that led to the ratification of 1215 Magna Carta.

In more recent times, the island has been used as a boating centre. Kingston Rowing Club, founded in 1858, occupied Raven's Ait for 76 years before moving in 1935 to Kingston, where it is now based in Canbury Gardens. Raven's Ait was then used by Theatre and Cinema Equipment Ltd as a warehouse, until bought in 1944 and presented to the Sea Cadet Corps by an anonymous supporter, for use as a river headquarters. It was the location of the Corps' first national regatta in September 1954.

In 1955, The Navy League opened TS Neptune on Raven's Ait to teach sailing, canoeing and boating skills to members of the Sea Cadet Corps, the Girls' Nautical Training Corps. Run with naval discipline, it had day facilities for 200 boys or girls and sleeping accommodation for up to 105 boys. The facilities were also made available to other youth organisations and to schools. The Duke of Edinburgh visited the island in 1958. Originally the island's buildings were wooden clad "Sea Cadet Blue", with old–style dormitories. In 1971 the entire accommodation, except the superintendent's house, was rebuilt by Haymills Construction, replacing all the old wooden structures with today's island buildings. During the rebuilding, a small number of activities were carried on downstream of Kingston upon Thames, at the Albany Park sailing base opposite The Royal Canoe Club, with instructors commuting daily by boat. The Navy League closed the centre in October 1975 due to escalating running costs.

Purchased by the Inner London Education Authority, the island's facilities were used as a youth and community workers training centre and a water sports activity facility by London schools, until the island was sold to Kingston Borough Council in 1989. The council, after reviewing possible alternative uses, leased the island to a company for use as a conference and wedding centre, the Ravens Ait Hall Management Company Ltd, which went into administration and closed in December 2008.

In early 2009 squatters occupied the island with the declared aim of turning its facilities into an eco conference centre. Kingston Council, who owned the freehold, took court action and the occupants were evicted on 1 May 2009. According to local media reports, during their stay the squatters had used as much electric power as would supply 45 homes. However this was disputed by the squatters who said that this was because before they arrived large industrial refrigerators and other appliances had been left running by the owners.

Since 2009 the island has been used mainly as a venue for weddings and corporate events.

Activities as a Navy League watersports venue
Raven's Ait was accredited by the Royal Yachting Association and by the British Canoe Union to conduct training in their respective disciplines. It also provided a semi-permanent mooring for Sparkle, a catamaran designed by Angus Primrose to be sailed by persons of restricted physical ability and mobility.

Motor boating skills
The boats were almost all naval stock, diesel powered:
A 25-foot naval cutter (Twin-cylinder diesel), centre pseudo-cabin housing engine
Several "Viking" open tenders (single-cylinder air-cooled diesel) with poor handling
A Workboat with a cuddy, acquired from Haymills Construction after the rebuild, similar to the Vikings, but with better handling
"Number 8", a small clinker-built smart, stubby, open launch, about 16-foot LOA with relatively low freeboard (Single-cylinder Lister air-cooled diesel)

Pulling (rowing)
Basic pulling skills were taught, usually to Sea Cadets, either in the ASC or in one of a pair of admiralty whalers (a clinker built pulling boat of approximately 28' LOA, slim beam, designed for naval pulling races, but originally a practical ship's boat).

Sailing
Boats were a mixture of typical naval stock and somewhat strengthened "ordinary" dinghies.

There were the following fleets:
 ASCs - the "Admiralty Sailing Craft" 16 foot gaff rigged dinghy, sometimes known as the GRP16, moored alongside the island.
 Bosuns, allegedly able to be swung out from Her Majesty's ships on a torpedo hoist in the middle of any ocean
 Cadets, a class of sailing dinghy designed to be sailed by two children up to the age of 17
 Coypus, a redoubtable short, fat, slow gaff rigged dinghy
 Fireballs, kept at Island Barn Reservoir for trapeze training
 GP14s, heavily strengthened
 Puffin Pacers, a light Jack Holt design made by Polycell Prout with a tendency to scoop up a large volume of water over the leeward quarter when hardening up.

Schools which used Raven's Ait
A number of schools used Raven's Ait for watersports under the Navy League, including:
 Epsom College
 Stockwell Manor
 Forest Hill School
 Glyn County Grammar School
 Sutton County Grammar School

See also
Islands in the River Thames

Notes

External links
Raven's Ait website

Geography of the Royal Borough of Kingston upon Thames
History of Surrey
Islands of London
Islands of the River Thames
Squats in the United Kingdom